The Next Step may refer to:

Music
The Next Step (Kurt Rosenwinkel album), 2001
The Next Step (People Under the Stairs album)
The Next Step (James Brown album), 2002
The Next Step, the backing band of Kamasi Washington on the 2005 album Live at 5th Street Dick's

Television
The Next Step (1991 TV series), American technology magazine television show
The Next Step (2013 TV series), Canadian drama series about young dancers
"The Next Step", a season 4 episode of the TV series Everwood

Other uses
The Next Step, a newspaper published by the Revolutionary Communist Party in the UK from 1978 to 1988

See also

Next Step (disambiguation)

Next (disambiguation)
Step (disambiguation)